Roberto Niculae Voican (born 6 February 2003) is a Romanian professional footballer who plays as a midfielder for Liga I side FC Voluntari.

References

External links
 

2003 births
Living people
Sportspeople from Bucharest
Romanian footballers
Association football midfielders
Liga I players
Liga III players
FC Voluntari players